Clube dos Empregados da Petrobrás - Duque de Caxias, usually known  as CEPE-Caxias, is a Brazilian women's football team, from Duque de Caxias, Rio de Janeiro state.

History
CEPE-Caxias was founded on March 29, 1999.

In 2006, and in 2007, the club won the Carioca Women's Football Championship.

In 2006, CEPE-Caxias also finished as Brazil Trophy's runner-up, after being defeated in the final by Botucatu.

The club, in a partnership with Duque de Caxias, won the Copa do Brasil de Futebol Feminino in 2010. The title qualified them for the 2011 Copa Libertadores Femenina, where they finished its group stage third out of four.

They won the Campeonato Carioca again in 2011, after beating Vasco in the final.

Achievements
 Copa do Brasil de Futebol Feminino:
 Winners (1): 2010
 Campeonato Carioca de Futebol Feminino:
 Winners (3): 2006, 2007, 2011
 Campeonato Brasileiro de Futebol Feminino:
 Runners-up (1): 2006

Stadium

São José play their home games at Estádio Romário de Souza Faria, nicknamed Marrentão. The stadium has a maximum capacity of 10,000 people.

Noted players
 Ester

References

External links
 Official website

Association football clubs established in 1999
Women's football clubs in Brazil
1999 establishments in Brazil